Davivienda is a Colombian bank founded on August 1, 1972, which renders services to individuals, companies, and the rural sector. Currently, it is part of Grupo Bolivar and it is the third-largest bank in Colombia by assets and profits.

History 
The Corporación Colombiana de Ahorro y Vivienda, Coldeahorro, was created in August 1972. It opened its doors to the public on November 15, 1972, with the main branch in Bogotá, and one branch in each of the cities of Medellín, Cali, and Barranquilla.

On January 30, 1973, Coldeahorro changed its name to Corporación Colombiana de Ahorro y Vivienda, Davivienda.

On July 1, 1997, Davivienda became Banco Davivienda S.A. and in May 2006, it merged with Banco Superior. In 2006, it purchased Granbanco S.A - Bancafé from the Colombian government for US$2.2 billion, outbidding Banco de Bogotá by US$327 million. The acquisition allowed Davivienda to expand its business in the corporate and agricultural markets.

Davivienda has used the "Casita Roja" (small red house) as a national and international logo since 1973. In 1994, the company introduced the "su dinero puede estar en el lugar equivocado" (your money may be in the wrong place) tag line as part of its advertising campaigns.

Davivienda purchased the Costa Rica, El Salvador, and Honduras operations of HSBC in 2012.

In 2010, Davivienda received permission from the United States Federal Reserve to operate a branch in Miami, Florida. The branch opened in 2011.

On November 6, 2021, Davivienda announces that Rappi Bank will arrive in Colombia in 2022 in alliance with Rappi, an entity that would absorb the 760,000 Rappi Pay customers and more than 100,000 RappiCard credit card customers in Colombia.

Davivienda is a compound of "da Vivienda," which is Spanish for "providing a dwelling".

References

External links 
 

Banks of Colombia
Privately held companies of Colombia
Banks established in 1972
Companies based in Bogotá
Companies listed on the Colombia Stock Exchange
Colombian brands